Chautauqua is a city in Chautauqua County, Kansas, United States.  As of the 2020 census, the population of the city was 108.

History
Chautauqua was founded in 1881, and it was incorporated in 1882.

Geography
Chautauqua is located at  (37.026172, -96.178458).

Climate
The climate in this area is characterized by hot, humid summers and generally mild to cool winters.  According to the Köppen Climate Classification system, Chautauqua has a humid subtropical climate, abbreviated "Cfa" on climate maps.

Demographics

2010 census
As of the census of 2010, there were 111 people, 52 households, and 33 families residing in the city. The racial makeup of the city was 87.4% White, 3.6% Native American, 0.9% Asian, and 8.1% from two or more races. Hispanic or Latino of any race were 0.9% of the population.

There were 52 households, of which 23.1% had children under the age of 18 living with them, 44.2% were married couples living together, 7.7% had a female householder with no husband present, 11.5% had a male householder with no wife present, and 36.5% were non-families. 34.6% of all households were made up of individuals, and 15.3% had someone living alone who was 65 years of age or older. The average household size was 2.13 and the average family size was 2.58.

The median age in the city was 48.2 years. 16.2% of residents were under the age of 18; 9% were between the ages of 18 and 24; 17.1% were from 25 to 44; 32.4% were from 45 to 64; and 25.2% were 65 years of age or older. The gender makeup of the city was 48.6% male and 51.4% female.

2000 census
As of the census of 2000, there were 113 people, 53 households, and 29 families residing in the city. The racial makeup of the city was 89.38% White, 7.08% Native American, and 3.54% from two or more races.

There were 53 households, out of which 22.6% had children under the age of 18 living with them, 39.6% were married couples living together, 15.1% had a female householder with no husband present, and 43.4% were non-families. 43.4% of all households were made up of individuals, and 22.6% had someone living alone who was 65 years of age or older. The average household size was 2.13 and the average family size was 2.97.

In the city, the population was spread out, with 24.8% under the age of 18, 8.0% from 18 to 24, 19.5% from 25 to 44, 24.8% from 45 to 64, and 23.0% who were 65 years of age or older. The median age was 42 years. For every 100 females, there were 79.4 males. For every 100 females age 18 and over, there were 88.9 males.

The median income for a household in the city was $18,500, and the median income for a family was $19,583. Males had a median income of $31,250 versus $15,750 for females. The per capita income for the city was $9,781. There were 27.3% of families and 38.5% of the population living below the poverty line, including 65.7% of under eighteens and 13.8% of those over 64.

Education
Chautauqua is served by Chautauqua County USD 286 public school district, and its Sedan Jr/Sr High School is located in Sedan.

Chautauqua High School was closed through school unification. Chautauqua High School won the Kansas State High School boys class B basketball championship in 1927.

References

Further reading

External links
 Chautauqua - Directory of Public Officials
 USD 286, local school district
 Chautauqua city map, KDOT

Cities in Kansas
Cities in Chautauqua County, Kansas